David John Rainford (born 21 April 1979) is an English former footballer. He now works for the Premier League.

Rainford left Dagenham & Redbridge at the end of the 2007–08 season after he was offered a senior teaching role at a local school. During the 2007–08 season, Rainford had become known for being the only semi-professional player in the Football League.

In June 2008 Rainford joined Chelmsford City. On 8 June 2012 he was confirmed as their assistant manager following the departure of Ben Chenery.

Honours
Conference National (V): 2007

Personal life
Rainford has a daughter, Molly, an actress and singer.

References

External links

1979 births
Living people
Footballers from Stepney
English Football League players
National League (English football) players
Colchester United F.C. players
Scarborough F.C. players
Grays Athletic F.C. players
Bishop's Stortford F.C. players
Dagenham & Redbridge F.C. players
Chelmsford City F.C. players
Wivenhoe Town F.C. players
Hornchurch F.C. players
Association football midfielders
English footballers
Chelmsford City F.C. non-playing staff